The Shenzhen New Century Liebao Club, also known as Shenzhen Marco Polo or Shenzhen Leopards (previously Shenzhen Aviators) are a Chinese professional basketball team which plays in the Southern Division of the Chinese Basketball Association (CBA). New Century is the club's corporate sponsor.

The team is based in Longgang District, Shenzhen, Guangdong, and plays its home games at the Shenzhen Universiade Sports Centre (SUSC).

History
The club was founded in 2003 as Dongguan New Century Leopards and was initially located in Dongguan, Guangdong. After twelve seasons, the team relocated to nearby Shenzhen in 2015. Success came early in their existence for the Leopards, as they were the runners-up in the 2004 Chinese Basketball League (CBL) championship, and were promoted to the Chinese Basketball Association (CBA) for the 2005–06 season.

In its first season in the CBA in 2005–06, Dongguan finished in seventh and last place in the South Division, and was out of the playoffs. The team would soon battle its way to respectability, however, becoming somewhat regular participants in the CBA's postseason over the ensuing years.

In July 2011, NBA point guard Jeremy Lin played for the team at the ABA Club Championship, and was named the MVP of the tournament.

On December 26, 2013, Bobby Brown scored a franchise-record 74 points in a game against Sichuan Blue Whales.

Current roster

Notable players
- Set a club record or won an individual award as a professional player.
- Played at least one official international match for his senior national team at any time.
  Shen Zijie
  Askia Booker

References

External links 
 Shenzhen New Century Leopard Club at CBA website 

 
Chinese Basketball Association teams
Sport in Dongguan
Sports teams in Guangdong
Basketball teams established in 2003
2003 establishments in China